Ma Lingjuan (born ), is a retired professional wushu taolu athlete from Anhui. She is a two-time world champion and Asian champion, and a gold medalist at the 2006 Asian Games, 2008 Beijing Wushu Tournament, and the World Games.

Career 
Ma started training wushu in 1993 at the age of five. In 1997, she was transferred to the Anhui Provincial Wushu Team.

Ma's first major international debut was at the 2004 Asian Wushu Championships where she won the gold medal in qiangshu. She then competed in the 2005 World Wushu Championships in Hanoi, Vietnam where she became the world champion in the same event. A year later, she competed in the 2006 Asian Games in Doha, Qatar, and won the gold medal in the women's changquan all-around event. Almost a year later, she competed in the 2007 World Wushu Championships in Beijing and won once again in qiangshu. This qualified Ma for the 2008 Beijing Wushu Tournament where she won in the women's jianshu and qiangshu combined event. Her last major international competition was at the 2009 World Games in Kaohsiung, Taiwan, where she won in the same event. Shortly after, she won the gold medal by 0.01 points in women's jianshu and qiangshu at the 2009 National Games of China in Shandong, thus achieving the "grand slam" of wushu.

See also 

 List of Asian Games medalists in wushu

References

External links 

 Athlete profile at the 2008 Beijing Wushu Tournament

1987 births
Living people
Chinese wushu practitioners
Competitors at the 2008 Beijing Wushu Tournament
World Games medalists in wushu
World Games gold medalists
Wushu practitioners at the 2006 Asian Games
Asian Games gold medalists for China
Medalists at the 2006 Asian Games
Asian Games medalists in wushu